The Bank of Cape Verde is Cape Verde's central bank. Its headquarter is located on Avenida Amílcar Cabral, in the national capital of Praia on the island of Santiago. Its current governor is João António Pinto Coelho Serra, who is in office since December 2014.

Governors
Corentino Santos, 1975-1984
Amaro da Luz, 1984-1991
Oswaldo Sequeira, 1991-1999
Olavo Correia, 1999-2004
Carlos Burgo, 2004-2014
João Serra, 2014-

History
The government established the Bank of Cape Verde in 1975, as a bank that combined commercial banking and central banking functions. The government created the bank by nationalizing the operations of the Portuguese colonial and overseas bank, Banco Nacional Ultramarino, which had established its first branch in Cape Verde in 1865. In 1993, the government split off the commercial banking functions into the newly established Banco Comercial do Atlântico.

See also

Economy of Cape Verde

References

External links
Official website of the Banco do Cabo Verde

Cape Verde
Banks of Cape Verde
1975 establishments in Cape Verde
Banks established in 1975
Praia